The 1984–85 FIS Ski Jumping World Cup was the sixth World Cup season in ski jumping. It began in Thunder Bay, Canada on 8 December 1984 and finished in Štrbské Pleso, Czechoslovakia on 24 March 1985. The individual World Cup was won by Matti Nykänen and Nations Cup by Finland.

Map of world cup hosts 
All 16 locations which have been hosting world cup events for men this season. Event in Gstaad was completely canceled.

 Four Hills Tournament
 Swiss Tournament
 KOP International Ski Flying Week

Calendar

Men

Standings

Overall

Nations Cup

Four Hills Tournament

References 

World cup
World cup
FIS Ski Jumping World Cup